"I'm Beginning to See the Light" is a popular song and jazz standard, with music written by Duke Ellington, Johnny Hodges, and Harry James and lyrics by Don George and published in 1944.

1945 recordings
Ella Fitzgerald and the Ink Spots featuring Bill Kenny recorded a version in 1945, that was on the pop song hits list for six weeks in 1945, reaching #5. 
A competing 1945 recording by Harry James and his Orchestra, with lead vocals by Kitty Kallen reached No. 1 for two weeks in January of that year. James' version of the song reached No. 7 on Billboard's Second Annual High School Survey in 1945. 
Duke Ellington also released in 1945 a version, vocal by Joya Sherrill, which reached the top ten.

Other notable recordings
Rosemary Clooney – Out of This World (2000)
Bobby Darin (1962) - featured in the 1996 feature film Swingers.
Frank Sinatra (1962) - "Sinatra And Swingin' Brass"
Seal (2017) - "Standards"
Johnnie Ray (1958)
Connie Francis (1958)
Oscar Alemán (1946)
Billy Eckstine recorded the song many times: with Billy May, with Quincy Jones, with Bobby Tucker and with Gil Askey.
In 1986 Australian recording artist Kate Ceberano recorded a version for her album Kate Ceberano and her Septet.
Duke Ellington and his Famous Orchestra. Vocal: Joya Sherrill Recorded in New York City on December 1, 1944. It was released by RCA Victor Records as catalogue number 20-1618 This recording went to number four on the Harlem Hit Parade chart and number six on the pop chart.
Ella and Basie!, a 1963 Verve release with arrangements by Quincy Jones.
Mary Stallings and Cal Tjader - Cal Tjader Plays, Mary Stallings Sings (Fantasy, 1961)
Clare Fischer – Songs for Rainy Day Lovers (1967)
 Peggy Lee – Things Are Swingin' (1958) Capitol Records ST 1049 US 
Peggy Lee – Spotlight on Peggy Lee (1995)
Gerry Mulligan - Gerry Mulligan with Chet Baker (1955)
Joanie Sommers on Positively the Most! (1960)
Sutton Foster recorded a version for her album Wish
The Hi-Lo's – A Musical Thrill (2006)
The Ink Spots featuring Bill Kenny & Ella Fitzgerald
Chelsea Krombach performed the song for her debut album Look for the Silver Lining
The SuperJazz Big Band of Birmingham, Alabama, recorded the song on the CD UAB SuperJazz, Featuring Ellis Marsalis
Michael Bublé
Dee Dee Bridgewater – Prelude to a Kiss: The Duke Ellington Album (1996)
Al Jarreau in his album "Accentuate the Positive"
Kelly Rowland
Joe Jackson recorded a cover of the song for his Duke Ellington tribute album, "The Duke".
Royce Campbell – Get Happy (2007)
Mel Tormé –  "At the Crescendo"
Karen Souza - Velvet Vault (2017)
Bob Dorough with Bill Takas; Beginning to See the Light (1976)
Natalie Cole (1993)

References

1944 songs
1945 singles
Songs with music by Duke Ellington
Songs with lyrics by Don George
Songs written by Johnny Hodges
Songs with lyrics by Harry James
Lena Horne songs
Johnnie Ray songs